Russian Nights  ( / Russkie nochi) is an 1844 collection of philosophical essays and novellas by Vladimir Odoyevsky. The work is a sprawling Gothic 'frame-novel', built on romantic principles inspired by Friedrich von Hardenberg (Novalis, 1772-1801) and Friedrich Wilhelm Joseph von Schelling (1775-1854), loosely modelled on the Noctes Atticae, and which like E.T.A. Hoffmann mixes genres and styles.

References

1844 Russian novels